Samu Pyykkönen (born 4 September 1994) is a Finnish professional ice hockey centre currently playing for Hokki in Mestis.

Pyykkönen made his professional debut for Hokki during the 2012–13 Mestis season, playing eight games and scoring one goal. He then became a regular member of the team until 2017 when he joined fellow Mestis team IPK. After two seasons with IPK, Pyykkönen returned to Hokki on 21 May 2019.

References

External links

1994 births
Living people
Finnish ice hockey centres
Hokki players
Iisalmen Peli-Karhut players
People from Suomussalmi
Sportspeople from Kainuu